Mizoguchi (written: 溝口 lit. "gutter/drain entrance") is a Japanese surname. Notable people with the surname include:

 Hajime Mizoguchi, musician
, Japanese samurai and daimyō
 Kazuhiro Mizoguchi, javelin thrower
 Kenji Mizoguchi, filmmaker
Koji Mizoguchi (born in 1963), Japanese archaeologist
, Japanese daimyō
, Japanese daimyō
 Noriko Mizoguchi, Japanese judoka

Fictional characters
 Hiroshi Mizoguchi, Hikaru no Go 
 Mizoguchi Makoto, Fighter's History
 The main character of Yukio Mishima's novel Kinkaku-ji

Japanese-language surnames